Isyana stylized as Sri Isyana Tunggawijaya was a queen regnant of Mataram Kingdom, in East Java, that ruled since 947 CE. She co-reigned with her spouse, Sri Lokapala. The Isyana dynasty, established by her father, Mpu Sindok that ruled Java circa the 10th century CE, was named after her.

Reign 
Sri Isyana Tunggawijaya was the daughter of Mpu Sindok, a Javanese king that moved the capital of Mataram Kingdom from central Java to east Java. Nothing much is known from her reign, except that her husband was Sri Lokapala, a nobleman from neighboring Bali island.

Inscription dated from Sri Isyana-Sri Lokapala reign is Gedangan inscription dated 950, mentioned about a royal award of Bungur Lor and Asana villages for Buddhist sangha (priest community) in Bodhinimba. According to Pucangan inscription, the successor of royal couple Isyana-Lokapala was their son, Sri Makutawangsa Wardhana.

References

Bibliography 
 Marwati Poesponegoro & Nugroho Notosusanto. 1990. Sejarah Nasional Indonesia Jilid II. Jakarta: Balai Pustaka
 Slamet Muljana. 1979. Nagarakretagama dan Tafsir Sejarahnya. Jakarta: Bhratara

Mataram Kingdom
Indonesian Hindu monarchs
Queens regnant in Asia
Women rulers in Indonesia
10th-century women rulers
10th-century Indonesian women